Megawatts and Megatons is a 2001 book by Richard L. Garwin and Georges Charpak. The book is said to be a good primer on nuclear power and also a detailed discussion of nuclear weapons and potential paths for weapons reduction.
  
The book presents detailed information about nuclear reactors and provides useful information on nuclear power program development in the United States and France.  A discussion on nuclear weapons and non-proliferation follows.

See also
Megatons to Megawatts Program
List of books about nuclear issues
Nuclear disarmament
Energy amplifier
Accelerator-driven sub-critical reactor

References

Nuclear history
2001 non-fiction books
Books about nuclear issues
Nuclear power in France
Nuclear technology in the United States